Ahmed Fahmie bin Jamil (born 20 April 1987) is a former Singaporean footballer who formerly played as a forward for S.League club Home United and the Singapore national team.

Early life
Ahmed Fahmie was born and raised in Tampines, Singapore to Jamil Bin Sawi and Laila Binte Azzan Abdat. He went to Qiaonan Primary School and Pasir Ris Secondary School. He also has a younger brother named Ahmed Farhie Bin Jamil. He is currently Married.

Football career
Fahmie started his career at Home United in 1998, progressing through the club's youth system. He also represented Singapore's youth teams in the 2004 and 2005 Lion City Cup.

In 2006, he joined Tampines Rovers in the Prime League. Impressive displays earned him a starting place in the AFC Cup away defeat against Osotsapa FC.

Fahmie was the top-scorer in the Prime League in the 2006 and 2007 season.

Fahmie then announced his arrival in the S.League in 2008 when he scored a few vital goals for Tampines, most notably, a last minute equaliser against Woodlands Wellington FC.

References

External links
 
 

Singaporean footballers
1987 births
Living people
Tampines Rovers FC players
Home United FC players
Singapore Premier League players
Association football forwards
Singapore international footballers